The Bentley EXP 100 GT is a concept car introduced by Bentley for its 100th anniversary, on 10 July 2019. It is Bentley's vision of a GT car for 2035. The car is a fully electric 2-door coupe, can hit 60 mph in 2.5 seconds and has a top speed of 186 mph. The car's doors open vertically and are two-meter wide and the car is 5.8 meter long.

Gallery

References

External links
Bentley Motors page

EXP 100 GT
Electric cars
Cars introduced in 2019
Grand tourers